Paradise is a 1928 British silent drama film directed by Denison Clift and starring Betty Balfour, Joseph Striker and Alexander D'Arcy. The screenplay concerns a clergyman's daughter who wins £500, and decides to take a holiday on the French Riviera. There she became ensnared  by a foreign fortune hunter, but her true love comes and rescues her.

Cast
 Betty Balfour as Kitty Cranston 
 Joseph Striker as Dr. John Halliday 
 Alexander D'Arcy as Spirdoff 
 Winter Hall as Reverend Cranston 
 Barbara Gott as Lady Liverage 
 Dino Galvani as Manager 
 Boris Ranevsky as Commissionaire 
 Albert Brouett as Detective 
 Ina De La Haye as Douchka

References

Bibliography
 Low, Rachel. The History of British Film: Volume IV, 1918–1929. Routledge, 1997.

External links

1928 films
British drama films
British silent feature films
1928 drama films
Films directed by Denison Clift
Films shot at British International Pictures Studios
Films set in England
Films set in France
British black-and-white films
1920s English-language films
1920s British films
Silent drama films